Stanislav Oleksandrovych Bogush (born 25 October 1983 in Zaporizhia, Soviet Union) is a professional Ukrainian football goalkeeper who played for FC Vorskla Poltava in the Ukrainian Premier League.

Career
Bohush is a product of the Metalurh Zaporizhzhia Youth system. He gave his debut for the senior team on 14 March 2004, at a home game against Dnipro Dnipropetrovsk, in which the Metalurh Zaporizhzhia finished in a 0:0 draw. He made his Champions League debut against Spartak Moscow in a 4–1 win for Kyiv.

Honours
In 2003 Bohush was recognized as the best goalkeeper at the L'Alcúdia International Football Tournament.

After playing an away match on 3 August 2008, against rivals Zorya Luhansk, Bohush was named by UA-Football and by magazine Sport-express in Ukraine (Спорт-экспресс в Украине) as the best goalkeeper of the third round.

Dynamo Kyiv
On Monday, 11 August 2008, Stanyslav Bohush signed a 5-year contract with Ukrainian giants Dynamo Kyiv where he should fill in the vacant spot in the club's official squad for the UEFA Champions League third qualifying round game against Spartak Moskva. He was invited by Dynamo Kyiv vice-president Leonid Ashkenazi to play for the team.

Bohush gave his debut for Dynamo against his former team Metalurh Zaporizhzhia on Sunday, 17 August 2008, during which Dynamo Kyiv won 2:0 and Bohush had to make two saves. He soon replaced Oleksandr Shovkovskyi as the main goalkeeper of Dynamo.

International
Stanyslav Bohush has played for the Ukraine national under-19 and under-21 football teams.

After several outstanding performances in UEFA Champions League matches for Dynamo during which he was even named "Man of the Match", Ukraine's head coach called him up to the senior national team for the first time for a World Cup Qualifying Match against Croatia.

References

External links
 Profile on Official Metalurh Zaporizhzhia Website 
 Profile on EUFO
 Profile on Football Squads
 Profile on Official Dynamo Kyiv Website 
 Profile on Dynamo Mania 

Ukrainian footballers
Ukraine international footballers
Ukraine under-21 international footballers
Ukraine youth international footballers
FC Metalurh Zaporizhzhia players
FC Metalurh-2 Zaporizhzhia players
FC Dynamo Kyiv players
FC Arsenal Kyiv players
FC Vorskla Poltava players
Ukrainian Premier League players
Association football goalkeepers
1983 births
Living people
Footballers from Zaporizhzhia